Capriccio Brillant, op. 22 is an 1832 composition by Felix Mendelssohn.

References 

 

Compositions by Felix Mendelssohn
1832 compositions

ș